Aromai Airport is an airport in Siwo on Emae Island in Vanuatu .

A departure tax is charged for departures from this airport.

Airlines and destinations

References

Airports in Vanuatu
Shefa Province